Herford is a Kreis (district) in the northeastern part of North Rhine-Westphalia, Germany. Neighboring districts are Minden-Lübbecke, Lippe, the urban district of Bielefeld and the districts of Gütersloh and Osnabrück.

History
The region is also known as Wittekind's land, as the last fights of Wittekind's Saxon tribes against Charlemagne took place here. He is believed to be buried in the town of Enger.

When the area became part of the Prussian province of Westphalia, the first district, Herford, was created in 1816. In 1832 it was merged with the district of Bünde. In 1911 the city of Herford left the district; however it lost its status as an independent urban district in 1969. The district reached its current size in 1973 when the municipality of Uffeln, which was formerly in the district of Minden, was merged into the city Vlotho.

Geography
The district is located between the three mountain chains of the Wiehen Hills in the north and the Teutoburg Forest in the south. To the northeast it is bounded by the Weser river.

Coat of arms
The black horse of Wittekind is depicted in the coat of arms of the district. After Wittekind was baptized Charlemagne gave him a white horse as present, which is now in the coat of arms of North Rhine-Westphalia and Lower Saxony.

Towns and municipalities

References

External links

Official website (German)

 
Districts of North Rhine-Westphalia